MS Princess Seaways is a cruiseferry operated and owned by the Danish shipping company DFDS Seaways on a route connecting North Shields, England, to IJmuiden in the Netherlands. She was built in 1986 as Peter Pan by Seebeckwerft, Bremerhaven, Germany for TT-Line. Between 1993 and 2002, the ship was operated by TT-Line Company of Tasmania under the name Spirit of Tasmania a service across the Bass Strait. In 2002, the ship was sold to Fjord Line and renamed Fjord Norway for service from Denmark. In 2006, she was sold to DFDS Seaways and sailed as Princess of Norway before being given her current name in 2011.

History 
Princess Seaways was built as the Peter Pan (the third TT-Line ship to bear the name) at Seebeckwerft, Bremerhaven, in 1986. Peter Pan began operations on the Travemünde–Trelleborg route on 6 February 1986. In 1990, TT-Line (Tasmania) decided it was time to replace the ferry Abel Tasman and arranged to buy the large ferry. It was expected they could get the ferry in late 1992 but TT-Line (Germany) could not let her go until 1993. She sailed from Germany in October 1993 and began sailing from Devonport to Melbourne in late November. She sailed four return trips a week. The crossings were overnight and one day/night and took approximately 15 hours.

In 2002 TT-Line (Tasmania) secured two new ferries: the Superfast III and Superfast IV from Superfast Ferries to replace the Spirit of Tasmania and her fleet mate HSC Devil Cat. The two new Superfasts were renamed Spirit of Tasmania I and Spirit of Tasmania II and began operations in September 2002.  Having crossed Bass Strait 2,849 times, carried a total of 2.3 million passengers, 807,000 cars and 185,000 containers, the Spirit of Tasmania was laid up in Sydney and offered for sale. After being laid up for a few months, she was sold to Fjord Line and refitted at Ørskov Yard in Frederikshavn. She was then renamed Fjord Norway and began serving the Bergen–Haugesund–Egersund–Hanstholm route until November 2005, when she took over the Bergen–Stavanger–Newcastle route from the Jupiter.

Fjord Norway was purchased by Danish shipping company DFDS Seaways and renamed Princess of Norway; she joined the DFDS Seaways fleet in November 2006 and was refurbished at Frederikshavn and began sailing on the Newcastle-Stavanger-Haugesund-Bergen route.

Princess of Norway swapped routes with the Queen of Scandinavia in May 2007, joining her sister ship King of Scandinavia on the IJmuiden - Newcastle route. Because of the equal capacity and layout of these sister ships, caravans are accepted at every sailing. In 2011, she was renamed Princess Seaways.

Sister ships
The third Peter Pan was the first of four sisters in the Peter Pan class, the others being:

Nils Holgersson was the second of the sisters built by Seebeckwerft for TT-Line. She was sold to Brittany Ferries in 1993 and renamed Val de Loire. In late 2005 she was sold to DFDS Seaways to serve the IJmuiden–Newcastle route as King of Scandinavia, subsequently renamed in 2011 as King Seaways.

Olau Hollandia was the third of the vessels and built by Schichau Seebeckwerft for TT-Line's sister company Olau Line to a modified design. With her Olau sister Olau Britannia she was charted in 1994 to P&O Ferries and renamed Pride of Le Havre. In 2005, she stopped operating for P&O and was subsequently sold to SNAV in Italy and renamed SNAV Sardegna.

The former MS Koningin Beatrix, sold in 1989 to Stena Line and renamed in 2002 as MS Stena Baltica, was built by the Dutch shipyard Van der Giessen de Noord for SMZ to a similar basic design as the four sisters, supplied by A.G. Weser.

References

 Ferry to Tasmania, A short History by Peter Plowman .
 Super~Ferries of Britain, Europe and Scandinavia by Russell Plummer .
Spirit of Tasmania on Ferries of Tasmania

External links 
 Ferries of Tasmania
  Fakta om Fartyg (Swedish)
  The ferry site

Cruiseferries
Ships built in Bremen (state)
Passenger ships of Germany
Passenger ships of Norway
Bass Strait ferries
1985 ships
DFDS